The 2010 Havant Borough Council election took place on 6 May 2010 to elect members of Havant Borough Council in Hampshire, England. One third of the council was up for election and the Conservative Party stayed in overall control of the council.

After the election, the composition of the council was:
Conservative 34
Liberal Democrats 3
Labour 1

Background
Before the election the Conservatives had 32 seats on the council, compared to 3 each for Labour and the Liberal Democrats. Among those defending seats at the election were the Conservative leader of the council Tony Briggs in Cowplain ward and the Labour group leader Richard Brown in Warren Park.

Election result
The Conservatives increased their majority on the council after gaining two seats, one each from Labour and the Liberal Democrats. The Conservative gain from Labour came in Warren Park, where they defeated the Labour group leader Richard Brown, while the Liberal Democrat defeat was in Bondfields, where the Conservative winner Frida Edwards became the first black councillor in Havant. Meanwhile, the Liberal Democrats gained a seat from Labour in Battins, where Labour's June Hanan had stood down at the election, and the new Liberal Democrat councillor Katie Ray became the youngest ever councillor in Havant at the age of 20. The council election took place at the same time as the 2010 general election, with the Conservative Member of parliament for Havant, David Willetts, doubling his majority.

Ward results

Barncroft

Battins

Bedhampton

Bondfields

Cowplain

Emsworth

Hart Plain

Hayling East

Hayling West

Purbrook

St Faiths

Stakes

Warren Park

Waterloo

References

2010 English local elections
May 2010 events in the United Kingdom
Havant Borough Council elections
2010s in Hampshire